Hickory is a North Carolina city located approximately  northwest of Charlotte. Its population in the 2020 census was 43,490. Primarily located in  Catawba County, its formal boundaries extend into Burke and Caldwell counties. Hickory is the principal city of the Hickory–Lenoir–Morganton Metropolitan Statistical Area, which had a population of 365,276 in the 2020 census.  

Reader's Digest named the Hickory metro area as the 10th best place to live and raise a family in the United States. Forbes named the Hickory-Lenoir-Morganton MSA the third best MSA in the country for business cost. Smart Growth America, however, identified the Hickory MSA as being the country's most sprawling metro area in 2014.

History
Hickory owes its name to the Hickory Tavern, a log structure built in the 1850s underneath a hickory tree. 

Henry Link bought the first lot in the area for $45 in 1858. The house he built became The 1859 Cafe, a restaurant which closed in 2011. 

The first train operated near Hickory Tavern in 1859. Nine years later in 1868, Dr. Jeremiah Ingold, pastor of Corinth Reformed Church (then German Reformed Grace Church), established the Free Academy, the first school in the area. Two years later, in 1870 Hickory Tavern was established as a town. Three years later, its name was officially changed to Hickory. In 1889, it became the City of Hickory.

Hickory experienced rapid growth in the 1880s.  Befitting a growing community, electric lights were installed 1888. A year later, the Elliott Opera House opened. Decorated in French renaissance style with mythology motifs, the opera house auditorium sat 750 and the parquet balcony fit another 350. The opera house hosted touring out of town shows, the "Hickory Amateurs," the city's first acting troupe, and The Hickory Symphony Band.  Tragically, a fire destroyed the entire building in 1902, and it was never rebuilt.  A municipal auditorium was constructed across the street in 1921, now housing the Hickory Community Theatre. 

In 1891, four Lutheran pastors founded Highland Academy, now Lenoir–Rhyne University, with then Highland Academy) with 12 students.

Hickory built a sewage system in 1904, and adopted the council-manager form of government in 1913.  

Hickory is home to one of the oldest furniture manufacturers in the United States that is still located and operated on the original site. Hickory White, formerly known as Hickory Manufacturing Company, was built in 1902 and has been in continuous operation ever since. During World War II, the factory made ammunition boxes for the U.S. military instead of furniture.

Hickory was known in the years after World War II for the "Miracle of Hickory". In 1944 the area around Hickory (the Catawba Valley) became the center of one of the worst outbreaks of polio ever recorded. Residents who were then children recall summers of not being allowed to play outside or visit friends for fear of contracting the disease. Since local facilities were inadequate to treat the victims, the citizens of Hickory and the March of Dimes decided to build a hospital to care for the children of the region. From the time the decision was made until equipment, doctors, and patients were in a new facility, took less than 54 hours. Several more buildings were quickly added. A Red Cross official on the scene praised the project "as the most outstanding example of cooperative effort he has ever seen."

The city also came to national attention when the remains of Zahra Baker were found leading to a police investigation where Zahra's stepmother, Elise Baker, was found guilty of second-degree murder. The Zahra Baker All Children's playground, located in Kiwanis Park, is named in her honor.

National Register of Historic Places
The Claremont High School Historic District, Elliott–Carnegie Library, First Presbyterian Church, Dr. Glenn R. Frye House, Clement Geitner House, Lee & Helen George House, Harris Arcade, Hickory Municipal Building, Hickory Southwest Downtown Historic District, Highland School, Hollar Hosiery Mills-Knit Sox Knitting Mills, Houck's Chapel, Kenworth Historic District, John A. Lentz House, Lyerly Full Fashioned Mill, John Alfred Moretz House, Oakwood Historic District, Piedmont Wagon Company, Propst House, Ridgeview Public Library, Shuford House, and Whisnant Hosiery Mills are listed on the National Register of Historic Places.

Geography
Hickory is located in western Catawba County at  (35.737682, −81.328372), and extends westward into Burke County and Caldwell County. Interstate 40 passes through the southern part of the city, leading east  to Winston-Salem and west  to Asheville. U.S. Route 70 (Conover Boulevard) is an older east–west route through the city. U.S. Route 321 passes through the western part of the city, leading northwest  to Boone and south  to Gastonia.

Lake Hickory
The dam parallels the NC Highway 16 bridge over the Catawba River between Interstate 40 and Taylorsville.

Lake Hickory was named after the City of Hickory and runs along its northern edge. Lake Hickory is a reliable source of water for the Cities of Hickory and Conover and the Town of Long View, while also functioning as a recreation hub for boating, fishing, and other water based activities.

Duke Energy provides five public access areas on the lake in cooperation with the North Carolina Wildlife Resources Commission.

Metropolitan area
Hickory is the largest city within the Hickory–Lenoir–Morganton metropolitan area. The Metropolitan Statistical Area (MSA) includes Catawba County, Burke County, Caldwell County, and Alexander County, with a combined population – as of the 2020 Census – of 365,276.

In addition to Hickory, the MSA includes the cities of Lenoir, Morganton, Conover, and Newton, along with a number of smaller incorporated towns and cities.

Several unincorporated rural and suburban communities located nearby include Bethlehem, Mountain View, and St. Stephens.

Climate

Transportation

Air
The Hickory Regional Airport is located in the western portion of the city and provides general aviation services. The airport is not serviced by a commercial airline given the proximity to larger nearby airports, particularly Charlotte-Douglas International Airport and Piedmont Triad International Airport.

Public transportation
Greenway Public Transportation operates six fixed bus routes around Hickory, Conover and Newton. Greenway also provides paratransit services to these cities and surrounding areas. Greenway Public Transportation provides over 250,000 trips each year to residents living in the Hickory region.

Highways
 
 U.S. Highway 321
 U.S. Highway 321 Business
 U.S. Highway 70
 North Carolina Hwy 127

Demographics

2020 census

As of the 2020 United States census, there were 43,490 people, 16,690 households, and 9,834 families residing in the city.

2010 census
As of the census of 2010, there were 40,093 people, 18,719 households, and 9,952 families residing in the city. There were 18,719 housing units at an average density of 640.4 per square mile (227.9/km2). The racial composition of the city was: 74.9% White, 14.3% Black or African American, 11.4% Hispanic or Latino American, 3.2% Asian American, 0.19% Native American, 0.06% Native Hawaiian or Other Pacific Islander, 3.08% some other race, and 1.46% two or more races.

There were 18,719 households, out of which 27.9% had children under the age of 18 living with them, 44.6% were married couples living together, 12.3% had a female householder with no husband present, and 39.1% were non-families. 32.2% of all households were made up of individuals, and 10.9% had someone living alone who was 65 years of age or older. The average household size was 2.35 and the average family size was 2.98.

In the city, the age distribution of the population shows 23.3% under the age of 18, 11.2% from 18 to 24, 30.7% from 25 to 44, 21.3% from 45 to 64, and 13.6% who were 65 years of age or older. The median age was 35 years. For every 100 females, there were 92.8 males. For every 100 females age 18 and over, there were 89.7 males.

The median income for a household in the city was $37,236, and the median income for a family was $47,522. Males had a median income of $31,486 versus $23,666 for females. The per capita income for the city was $23,263. About 8.4% of families and 11.3% of the population were below the poverty line, including 14.8% of those under age 18 and 7.0% of those age 65 or over.

364,759 people live within  of Hickory; 1.8 million people live within  of Hickory.

Government 
In 1913, Hickory became the first city in North Carolina to adopt the council-manager form of municipal government, which combines the leadership of elected officials and the administrative experience of a city manager. The mayor and city council set policy and hire a non-partisan manager to oversee city operations, advise council, and implement adopted policies and ordinances.

Hickory City Council is composed of a mayor and six council members, each representing one of the city's six wards. For current listing of council members, see here.

Education

Elementary schools
 Clyde Campbell Elementary School
 Jenkins Elementary School
 Longview Elementary School
 Oakwood Elementary School
 Snow Creek Elementary School
 Southwest Primary School
 Viewmont Elementary School
 Webb A. Murray Elementary School
 St. Stephens Elementary School

Middle schools
 Grandview Middle School
 Northview Middle School
 H. M. Arndt Middle School

High schools
 Hickory High School
 Challenger Early College High School
 Hickory Career and Arts Magnet High School
 St. Stephens High School

Private schools
 St. Stephens Lutheran School
 University Christian High School
 Hickory Christian Academy 
 Hickory Day School
 Tabernacle Christian School
 Christian Family Academy
 Cornerstone Christian Academy (Specialized for students with learning differences)

Colleges and universities
 Catawba Valley Community College
 Lenoir–Rhyne University
 Appalachian Center at Hickory
 Gardner–Webb University satellite campus
 North Carolina Center for Engineering Technologies
 Appalachian State University at Hickory (Opening Fall 2023)

Economy

Early industries such as wagon-making, as well as proximity to expansive forests and excellent transportation via two intersecting railroads, provided fertile ground for the emergence of the furniture industry. Likewise experience with textile manufacturing and easy access to power drove new industries in both fiber-optic cable and pressure-sensitive tape. Forty percent of the world's fiber optic cable is made in the Hickory area.

Adhesive tape manufacturer Shurtape Technologies and Fortune 500 network infrastructure provider CommScope are based in Hickory.

The furniture industry in Hickory is not as strong as in previous decades, but is still a primary component in the area economy. HSM (company) (formerly Hickory Springs, founded 1944) is a leading manufacturer of mattress coils.  It is estimated 60% of the nation's furniture used to be produced within a  radius of Hickory.

The Hickory area is marketed as a data-center corridor and is home to large data centers operated by Apple and Google. Apple's billion-dollar data center campus just south of Hickory is one of the world's largest.

Hickory is home to the corporate headquarters of third-party logistics provider Transportation Insight, a member of North Carolina's top revenue tier of privately held businesses. In 2015, the company relocated its headquarters to the historic Lyerly Full Fashioned Mill in downtown Hickory.

Major Industries 
 Manufacturing
 Education
 Healthcare
 Retail Trade
 Professional, scientific, and management
 Public Administration
 Transportation
 Construction

Major employers 
 Catawba Valley Medical Center 
 Frye Regional Medical Center/Duke LifePoint
 MDI
 Hickory Springs Manufacturing
 Corning Inc.
 CommScope 
 Convergys 
 Century Furniture 
 City of Hickory
 Catawba Valley Community College
 Performance Food Group
 Hickory Public Schools
 Sherrill Furniture Company
 Fiserv
 Transportation Insight
 Catawba County
 Catawba County Schools
 ITM
 Cataler North America

Tourism

Sports

Hickory is home to the Hickory Crawdads, a Class High-A High-A East minor-league baseball affiliate of the Texas Rangers. The Crawdads play in L.P. Frans Stadium, located in the western portion of the city, near the Hickory Regional Airport.

Hickory is also home to the Hickory Motor Speedway. The speedway was opened in 1951 and features a 1/2-mile track with seating for approximately 5,000 spectators.

Lenoir-Rhyne University, whose teams have the nickname "Bears", participates within NCAA Division II athletics in the South Atlantic Conference. The university's athletics program includes teams in baseball, basketball, cross country, football, golf, lacrosse, soccer, softball, swimming, tennis, track and field, triathlon, and volleyball.

Hickory Aviation Museum 
Hickory Aviation Museum is an aerospace museum at the Hickory Regional Airport. The museum originated from the Sabre Society co-founded by Kyle and Kregg Kirby, when an FJ-3 Fury, the Naval version of the North American F-86 Sabre was recovered and became the first aircraft of the museum. It features a museum located in the former airport terminal with artifacts, a hangar with aircraft and outdoor exhibits of aircraft on the former airport ramp.

Arts and Culture

Hickory Museum of Art 
Hickory is home to the second oldest art museum in North Carolina. Hickory Museum of Art was established in 1944 by Founding Director, Paul Whitener. The museum is housed at the SALT Block, overseen by the SALT Block Foundation, along with the Catawba Science Center, Hickory Choral Society, United Arts Council and Western Piedmont Symphony. Hickory Museum of Art (HMA) holds exhibitions, events, and public educational programs based on a permanent collection of 19th through 21st century American art. The museum also features a long-term exhibition of Southern contemporary folk art, showcasing the work of self-taught artists from around the region.

Western Piedmont Symphony 
The symphony hosts several series of concerts, including their free Foothills Pops concerts held annually in Downtown Hickory.

Media
 The Hickory Daily Record is published daily.
 Focus Newspaper is a free weekly publication, distributed every Thursday in print, online, and mobile app. Focus features local news and events, movie reviews, original columnists, places to go and things to do.
 WHKY, 1290 AM, is a radio station that features a news-talk format.
 WAIZ, "63 Big Ways", 630 AM, is a radio station that features music from the 1950s and 1960s. Its branding is an homage to the former "61 Big Ways" radio station (now WFNZ) in Charlotte, North Carolina.
 The local television station is WHKY-TV, channel 14.
 The Claremont Courier is a free newspaper distributed every month throughout Catawba County

Notable people

Athletes
 Jeff Barkley, MLB player
 Rick Barnes, college basketball head coach
 Madison Bumgarner, MLB pitcher, 3-time World Series Champion with the San Francisco Giants, 2014 World Series MVP
 Paul Burris, MLB catcher
 Ozzie Clay, NFL safety
 Matt DiBenedetto, NASCAR driver
 Landon Dickerson, NFL offensive lineman
 Robert Dillingham, high school basketball player
 Harry Dowda, NFL defensive back 
 Charlie Frye, MLB pitcher
 Robert Griswold, swimmer
 Ryan Hill, long-distance runner
 Andy Houston, NASCAR Cup Series, Xfinity Series and Camping World Truck Series driver
 Marty Houston, NASCAR Xfinity Series driver
 Tommy Houston, NASCAR Cup Series and Xfinity Series driver
 Dale Jarrett, 3-time Daytona 500 champion, 1999 NASCAR Cup Series champion, member of the NASCAR Hall of Fame
 Austin Johnson, NFL fullback
 Brad Knighton, Major League Soccer (MLS) goalkeeper
 Chad Lail, professional WWE wrestler 
 Bobby Lutz, college basketball coach, former UNC Charlotte men's basketball head coach
 Dick Marlowe, MLB pitcher
 Trevin Parks, professional basketball player
 Andy Petree, NASCAR crew chief and analyst
 J.T. Poston, PGA Tour player
 Gary Sain, NASCAR Cup Series driver
 Ryan Succop, NFL kicker, Super Bowl LV champion with the Tampa Bay Buccaneers
 Bob Warlick, NBA player, younger brother of Ernie Warlick
 Ernie Warlick, AFL player and 4-time Pro Bowl selection for the Buffalo Bills
 Chris Washburn, NBA player
 Shane Watts, World Enduro (off-road motorbike racing) champion

Entertainers
 Tori Amos, musician and songwriter, was born in the area during a family trip
 James Best, actor
 Eric Church, country music singer and songwriter 
 Tom Constanten, musician, composer, former member of the Grateful Dead and member of the Rock and Roll Hall of Fame
 Jon Reep, comedian
 Matthew Settle, actor
 Drew Starkey, actor
 Brandon Wardell, comedian
 Hermene Warlick Eichhorn, composer
 Machinedrum, aka Travis Stewart, musician
 The Blue Sky Boys, country music duo

Other notables
 Cass Ballenger, politician
 Norma Bonniwell, architect
 James Broselow, emergency physician, assistant professor, and entrepreneur
 Teresa Earnhardt, widow of Dale Earnhardt and stepmother to Dale Earnhardt Jr.
 Gary Glenn, Michigan House of Representatives (2015–18), Associate Speaker of the House Pro Tem and chairman of the House Energy Policy Committee (2017–18) 
 Kenneth Lamar Holland, former Democratic member of the United States House of Representatives
 Chris Hughes, co-founder of Facebook
 E. Patrick Johnson, ethnographer, scholar in critical race theory, queer theory, and performance studies
 Brock Long, FEMA Administrator
 J.B. Long, store manager/owner and record company talent scout
 Douglas E. Moore, Methodist minister and civil rights activist
 Scott Owens, poet, teacher, and editor
 William Powlas Peery, pastor of the Evangelical Lutheran Church in America
 Elwood L. Perry, inventor of the form of fishing lure known as the spoonplug
 Paul Whitener, landscape painter and founder of the Hickory Museum of Art

Sister city
Hickory has one sister city:
Altenburg, Germany

See also
 Hickory Aviation Museum
 Henry Fork (South Fork Catawba River tributary)
 Valley Hills Mall

References

External links
 
 
 Hickory Public Schools

 
Populated places established in 1863
1863 establishments in North Carolina
Cities in Caldwell County, North Carolina
Cities in Catawba County, North Carolina
Cities in Burke County, North Carolina
North Carolina populated places on the Catawba River